Operation Miracle or the Battle of Mavonde was a military raid in 1979 by the Rhodesian Security Forces (RSF) against ZANLA guerrilla bases in Mozambique towards the end of the Rhodesian Bush War. ZANLA put up stiff resistance and the tactical success of the RSF did not lead to the expected strategic changes.

Background
After successful Rhodesian air attacks on ZANLA bases, such as Operation Snoopy, the guerillas chose to set a new camp under the shelter of the forest near Mavonde, a few kilometers from Chimoio. As the Lancaster House discussions were taking place, RSF attempted to annihilate this base, hoping to weaken the Zimbabwean position.

The base was held by 6,000 ZANLA partisans, with many anti-aircraft weapons on hills. Many guns were located on the highest hill, later to be nicknamed "Monte Cassino". Two secondary hills, Hill 774 and Hill 761, were also dotted with anti-aircraft guns. These weapons were supplied by the Ethiopian Derg. Trenches were dug in the 64-square-kilometers surface of the camp. The base was commanded by Solomon Mujuru, known by his nom-de-guerre Rex Nhongo. 

Small-scale Rhodesian patrols erroneously estimated the ZANLA force to be 2,000 men strong; 200 Rhodesian soldiers were earmarked for the operation, with 100 men of the Selous Scouts spearheading the raid. Each of the ten-men was transported in a Unimog truck. The whole column, commanded by captain Richard Passaportis, contained 20 Unimogs, protected by Eland-90 armoured cars of the Rhodesian Armoured Corps. A detachment of QF 25-pounder guns was also part of the column. The Selous Scouts were supported by 100 men of the Rhodesian Light Infantry (2 Commando, 3 Commando and Support Commando), air-dropped 10 kilometers away from the camp.

Operation

First day 
Before attacking the base, the RSF ground forces had to cross a river. The artillery was bogged down and the guerilla was alerted of the size of the column. The column was further delayed by ZANLA fire. The first wave of the Selous Scouts began clearing the trenches but the rest of the column only arrive late in the afternoon. Meanwhile, the airdropped Rhodesian Light Infantry joined the battle and Mpunzarima, a key ZANLA military leader, was killed. At dawn, Nhongo distributed marijuana to some of his troops, to reduce their stress. The Rhodesian troops were harassed during the night by RPG-7s, recoilless-rifles and mortars.

Second day 
RSF renewed its assault. Nhongo personally went to the front to boost the morale of his troops, using a big stick to hit those reluctant to fight. Guided by a Reims Cessna "Lynx" aircraft, Hawker Hunter attack jets neutralized ZANLA fortifications in Hill 774. The position was taken at 3 pm by a troop of the Selous Scouts. English Electric Canberra bombers also bombed the anti-aircraft positions.

Third day 
During the night, RSF artillery fired at ZANLA positions to prevent the partisans from sleeping. At 10 am, two troops of Selous Scouts and a RLI section (around 100 men) led an assault on Monte Cassino. The summit was taken after the partisans had retreated, as was Hill 761. At the end of that day, Nhongo ordered his fighters to retreat, with mortar teams providing cover fire. During the late night, FRELIMO sent three or more T-34 or T-54 tanks and a squad of infantry to support the rebels but RSF 25-pounders quickly reacted, guided by Rhodesian SAS, and the tanks retreated after the lead tank was put out of action.

Consequences 
The Rhodesian force withdrew on the next morning, taking captured equipment with them. To avoid retaliation attacks from Mozambique, the Rhodesian Air Force bombed FRELIMO facilities but one Canberra and one Hunter were shut down. ZANLA suffered hundreds of casualties. The battle had no consequences on the Lancaster House discussions.

References

Bibliography
 

 
 

Airborne operations
Cross-border operations
Military raids
1979 in Rhodesia
1979 in Mozambique
September 1979 events in Africa
Mozambique–Rhodesia relations
Miracle